Cargeghe is a comune (municipality) in the Province of Sassari in the Italian region Sardinia, located about  north of Cagliari and about  southeast of Sassari.

Cargeghe borders the following municipalities: Codrongianos, Florinas, Muros, Osilo, Ossi.

Sights include the necropolis of S'Elighe Entosu, including a series of domus de janas (Neolithic tombs), the parish church (15th-16th centuries) and the countryside Romanesque church of Santa Maria 'e Contra (12th century).

References 

Cities and towns in Sardinia